Nossa Senhora do Livramento is a municipality in the state of Mato Grosso, Brazil. The population is 13,104 (2020 est.) in an area of 5076.78 km². Its elevation is 232 m. Jooel

References

External links

http://www.citybrazil.com.br/mt/nossasralivramento/ (in Portuguese)

Municipalities in Mato Grosso